Victor Bogaciuc (born 17 October 1999) is a Moldovan professional footballer who plays as a midfielder for Moldovan Super Liga club Petrocub Hîncești.

International career
He made his Moldova national football team debut on 1 September 2021 in a World Cup qualifier game against Austria, a 0–2 home loss. He substituted Radu Gînsari in the 59th minute.

References

External links
 
 

1999 births
Living people
Moldovan footballers
Moldova youth international footballers
Moldova under-21 international footballers
Moldova international footballers
Association football midfielders
FC Zimbru Chișinău players
CS Petrocub Hîncești players
Moldovan Super Liga players